Zapletal (feminine: Zapletalová) is a Czech surname. Notable people with the surname include:
 Emma Zapletalová (born 2000), Slovak athlete
 Jan Zapletal (disambiguation), multiple people
 Lubomír Zapletal (born 1951), Czech rower
 Petr Zapletal (born 1977), Czech volleyball player
 Václav Zapletal (born 1985), Czech footballer
 Vojtěch Zapletal (born 1998), Czech canoeist
 Vojtěch Zapletal (composer) (1877-1957), Czech composer

See also
 

Czech-language surnames